The Cedar Falls Ice House is an historic building located in Cedar Falls, Iowa, United States.  It was built in 1921 and has been listed on the National Register of Historic Places since 1977.  The building currently serves as the Ice House Museum.

History

The first ice house in Cedar Falls was built in 1858 near the homestead of William Sturgis, the first permanent resident of Black Hawk County.  It was destroyed in a fire on October 22, 1921.  Hugh Smith, who owned Cedar Falls Ice and Fuel Company, made plans for the present structure. It was completed in November 1921 by the Cedar Falls Construction Company. The first ice harvest began on January 10, 1922. The building served as an ice house from 1922 until Smith lost his business in 1934. Cedar Falls Trust and Savings Bank took over the building. It was used as a livestock barn and later was flooded for ice skating. In 1938 the city of Cedar Falls purchased the building and leased it to the Cedar Falls Boat Club. They occupied the building until 1976 when the building was condemned. That year the Cedar Falls Historical Society decided to save the structure. After a successful fund-raising campaign the building was renovated beginning in 1978, and the Ice House Museum opened on June 24, 1979. The building was damaged in a 2008 flood.

Architecture
It is constructed of hollow clay tiles and features an aerator and a two-pitch roof. The roof is supported by a center pole and the walls of the structure. When used as an ice house it could hold between 6,000 and 8,000 tons of ice.

See also
 List of ice companies

References

External links
Cedar Falls Historical Society

Industrial buildings completed in 1921
Buildings and structures in Cedar Falls, Iowa
Museums in Black Hawk County, Iowa
National Register of Historic Places in Black Hawk County, Iowa
Industrial buildings and structures on the National Register of Historic Places in Iowa
Round barns in Iowa
History museums in Iowa
Ice trade
Ice companies
1921 establishments in Iowa